Kim Chang-Ae is a former table tennis player from North Korea. From 1972 to 1978 she won several medals in doubles, and team events in the Asian Table Tennis Championships and in the World Table Tennis Championships.

References

North Korean female table tennis players
Asian Games medalists in table tennis
Table tennis players at the 1974 Asian Games
Living people
Year of birth missing (living people)
Place of birth missing (living people)
Asian Games bronze medalists for North Korea
Medalists at the 1974 Asian Games
20th-century North Korean women